Ethmia plaumanni is a moth in the family Depressariidae. It is found in Brazil.

The ground color of the forewings is white, with unicolorous blackish brown markings which are nearly black, faintly reflecting steel bluish in spots. The ground color of the hindwings is white, but dark brown at the distal margins.

References

Moths described in 1973
plaumanni